Karahüseyinli is a village in the Yavuzeli District, Gaziantep Province, Turkey. The village is populated by Kurds.

References

Villages in Yavuzeli District
Kurdish settlements in Gaziantep Province